Pukara (Aymara for fortress, Hispanicized spelling Pucara) is a  mountain in the Andes of Bolivia. It is located in the La Paz Department, Pacajes Province, Calacoto Municipality. Pukara lies north of the Anallajsi volcano, north-west of the mountain Pichaqa and south-west of the mountains Urqipi and Churi Willk'i. It is situated at the Jalsuri River, a right affluent of the Achuta River. The village of Pukara (Pucara) lies at its feet, south-east of it.

References 

Mountains of La Paz Department (Bolivia)